In the 2011–12 season, KK Mladost will compete in the National Championship of Bosnia and Herzegovina.

In
  Petar Jovanović (from Leotar)
  Miloš Trikić (from Borac Banja Luka)
  Goran Ignjatović (from  Crnokosa)
  Samir Lerić (from Čapljina Lasta)
  Nenad Đorić (from Servitium)
  Igor Bijelić (from Servitium)
  Almir Hasandić (from Zrinjski)

Out
  Miloš Komatina (to  Igokea)
  Milijan Bocka (to Igokea)
  Armin Avdibegović (to  Zrinjski)
  Bogdan Jovanović (to Zrinjski)
  Goran Ignjatović (to ---)
  Petar Jovanović (to ---)
  Miloš Trikić (to ---)

KK Mladost Mrkonjić Grad